Carl Barât is the debut solo album by Libertines co-frontman Carl Barât. It was released on 4 October 2010 in the UK. The album was mastered in New York City and was the first album released through his own self-funded record label Arcady, but distributed through PIAS Recordings. The first single to be released from the album was "Run With the Boys".

Its release was timed to coincide with Barât's memoirs, titled Threepenny Memoirs.

Track listing 
 "[The] Magus" (Barât, Andrew Wyatt) [3:16]
 "Je Regrette, Je Regrette" (Barât, Andrew Wyatt, Leo Abrahams) [3:05]
 "She's Something" (Barât, Findlay Brown) [2:29]
 "Carve My Name" (Barât, Davey Ray Moor, Leo Abrahams) [4:33]
 "Run With the Boys" (Barât, Davey Ray Moor) [3:24]
 "The Fall" (Barât, Neil Hannon) [3:31]
 "So Long, My Lover" (Barât) [3:38]
 "What Have I Done" (Barât, Andrew Wyatt) [3:42]
 "Shadows Fall" (Barât, Davey Ray Moor) [4:16]
 "Ode to a Girl" (Barât, Andrew Wyatt) [3:59]
 "Death Fires Burn at Night" (Japanese bonus track)
 "Irony of Love" (Japanese bonus track)

Personnel 
 Carl Barât – vocals, electric guitar on 2, guitar on 5, 7
 Edie Langley – backing vocals on 1, 2, 3, 8, 9, 10
 Ben Nichols – bass on 1, 2, 7, 8, 9
 Leo Abrahams – bass on 3, 4, 5, 6 7, guitar on 1, 2, 3, 4, 5, 6, 7, 8, 10, organ on 3, 5 9, percussion on 2, 4, 5, 7, 8, piano on 1, 2, 4, 5, 6, 7, 8, 9, programming on 1, 10
 Amy Langley – cello on 4, 6, 9, 10
 Phil Wilkinson – drums on 3, 4, 5, 6, 10
 Seb Rochford – drums on 1, 2, 7, 8, 9
 David Coulter - percussion on 1, banjo on 6, voicebox on 9
 Andrew Wyatt – programming on 1, 2, 10
 Ben Castle - saxophone on 5, horn on 9
 Chris Storr - trumpet on 5, flugelhorn on 9
 Kate St John - oboe and string & woodwind arrangement on 6
 Pete Whyman - bass clarinet and flute on 6
 Louise Hogan  – viola on 4, 6, 9, 10
 Una Palliser – viola on 7, 10, violin on 7, 10
 Ellie Stanford – violin on 4, 6, 9, 10
 Gita Langley – violin on 4, 6, 9, 10
 Rosie Langley – violin on 4, 6, 9, 10
 Sarah Sexton – violin on 4, 6, 9, 10
Technical
Andy Tommasi, Leo Abrahams, Oli Wright - engineer
Roger Sargent - sleeve design, photography
Toby Peacock - art direction

Critical reception 

The album received generally positive to mixed reviews from critics. The BBC Music Review compared its sound to early Morrissey and The Style Council.

Chart performance

References 

2010 debut albums
Carl Barât albums
Albums produced by Leo Abrahams